Nishat Group is a Pakistani multinational conglomerate company which is based in Lahore, Pakistan. The company was founded by Pakistani business magnate Mian Muhammad Yahya in 1951. Mian Muhammad Mansha is the current chairman of the group. 

Many of the Nishat Group's subsidiaries are listed on the Pakistan Stock Exchange.

History
The company was founded by Mian Muhammad Yahya, later the ownership went to Mian Muhammad Mansha, Chaiman of Nishat Group. Nishat Mills Faisalabad was the first textile mill they started. It had a net income of 520 million dollars in 2022.

Companies
Nishat Group is one of largest conglomerate companies in Pakistan. Some companies which group owns are:

Listed on Pakistan Stock exchange
Following are the companies which are listed on the Pakistan Stock Exchange:
 Adamjee Insurance Limited
 DG Cement
 MCB Bank
 Nishat Chunian

DG Khan Cement 

DG Khan is a major Pakistani cement manufacturer which the group acquired in 1992 under the privatization scheme. It has three active plants in the country. It generates around Rs. 2.2 billion per year. It has a production capacity of 24,000 tons per day.

MCB Bank

MCB Bank is one of the four largest banks in Pakistan. It is considered as one of the 'Big Five' banks of Pakistan. The bank was incorporated by Adamjee Group and it was nationalized by then Prime Minister Zulfikar Ali Bhutto. In the 1990s, it was privatized by then Prime Minister Nawaz Sharif's government and came under the Nishat Group.

In 2015, the bank generated around ₨66.43 billion which makes it one of the well-performing banks of Pakistan.

Nishat Chunian

Nishat Chunian Group was incorporated in 1990 to diversify the business of Nishat Group. Today, Nishat Chunian Group consists of four companies – Nishat Chunian Limited (a textile company), Nishat Chunian Power Limited (a power generation company), Nishat Chunian USA Inc. (Incorporated in the USA), and Nishat Chunian Electric Corporation Ltd.(a captive power generation company).

Lal Pir Power

Nishat Automobile

In February 2017, it was announced that both companies are venturing to assemble cars in Pakistan.

In March 2017, it was announced that Nishat Group will setup their first plant in Faisalabad, Pakistan, which will assemble electric cars. Nishat Group will have a 42% stake in the venture.

Unlisted
Following are the companies which are not listed on the Pakistani Stock Exchange:
 Nishat Linen

 Nishat Dairy (Private) Limited
 Nishat Hospitality (Private) Limited
 Nishat Papers Products Company Limited
 Pakistan Aviators & Aviation
 Security General Insurance Company Limited
 Nishat Hotels and Properties Limited
 Nishat (Aziz Avenue) Hotel and Properties Limited
 Nishat (Gulberg) Hotel and Properties Limited
 Nishat (Raiwind) Hotel and Properties Limited
 Nishat Agriculture Farming (Private) Limited
 Nishat Automobile (Private) Limited
 Nishat Developers (Private) Limited
 Nishat Commodities (Private) Limited
 Lalpir Solar Power (Private) Limited
 Nishat Real Estates Development Company (Private) Limited
 Nishat Farms Supplies (Private) Limited
 Nishat International FZE
 Nishat Global China Company Limited
 Nishat UK (Private) Limited
 Nishat Linen Trading LLC
 Nishat USA Inc.

See also 
List of largest companies in Pakistan

References

 
Conglomerate companies of Pakistan
Conglomerate companies established in 1951
Multinational companies headquartered in Pakistan
Pakistani companies established in 1951